Giovan Battista Verle was a 17th-century Italian instrument maker.

In Venice, in the footsteps of his father Giovanni, he built an anatomical model of the human eye with the help of Antonio Molinetti, professor of anatomy at the University of Padua. In Florence, he was encouraged to make a model of the eye by Antonio Magliabecchi (1633-1714), librarian to the Grand Duke, and Giuseppe Zambeccari (1659-1729), professor of anatomy at the University of Pisa.

External links 

Owen, Harry. Simulation in healthcare education: an extensive history. Springer, 2016.

17th-century Italian engineers
1739 births
1795 deaths
Engineers from Venice